Mabilleodes alacralis is a moth in the family Crambidae. It was described by James E. Hayden in 2011. It is found in the Madagascar.

References

Moths described in 2011
Odontiinae